(translated as Three Giant Men, sometimes Captain America and Santo vs. Spider-Man; Üç Dev Adam) is a 1973 Turkish cult superhero film, directed by T. Fikret Uçak and written by Doğan Tamer based on the characters created by Steve Ditko, Jack Kirby, Stan Lee, Joe Simon and Rodolfo Guzmán Huerta, featuring Aytekin Akkaya as Captain America and Yavuz Selekman as Santo called to Istanbul on a special mission to stop the villainous Spider-Man and his criminal gang. The film was popular and thus spawned other rip-offs of other major Hollywood productions

Plot
The story takes place in Istanbul, where a violent criminal organization led by Spider-Man surfaces in the city with counterfeit United States dollars. They also mutilate a woman's face via a boat propeller. A small task-force consisting of Captain America, Santo and Captain America's girlfriend, Julia arrives to help local police stop Spider-Man and his gang.

Julia, who has infiltrated Spider-Man's hideout, is captured and taken to a house in a remote location. She manages to send an SOS signal to the Captain. Captain America saves Julia and chases after Spider-Man, who manages to escape.

Meanwhile, Mexico's national superhero/wrestler, Santo, infiltrates the dojo that is used as a front for counterfeiting. After being captured, he manages to escape along with incriminating evidence.

Captain America and Santo raid a very important hideout where most of the counterfeiting operation is taking place. They manage to shut down the hideout while Spider-Man kills a couple, steals a statue and runs away.

Soon afterwards, another fight between heroes and Spider-Man begins. It is revealed that Spider-Man is able to spawn duplicates of himself when killed, as one Spider-Man is beaten to a pulp by Santo and another is strangled to death by Captain America.

Captain America and Santo then go undercover in a nightclub. Spider-Man's gang notice them and a fight occurs. The heroes are seemingly overpowered this time and are taken to Spider-Man's hideout. Once there Captain America and Santo act like they are fighting themselves to confuse their captors but manage to break out and eliminate most of the gang members. Spider-Man arrives at the end of the fight with his girlfriend, only to have her struck by a wild shot from the gun of one of his henchmen. He flees, with Captain America in hot pursuit.

Captain America catches Spider-Man and defeats him, only to hear the taunting laugh of yet another Spider-Man. The fight continues until each Spider-Man is dead.

As the heroes are about to leave Istanbul, Captain America sees what appears to be Spider-Man sitting in the back of a taxi and furiously runs to the taxi, grabs the person and immediately removes his mask only to realize that it was just a young boy wearing a red wrestling mask.

Cast
 Yavuz Selekman as Santo. The primary difference between this version of El Santo and the original is that the character in the film wears a wrestling mask only briefly, whereas the real-life Santo was never seen in public without one. Santo was famous during the '60s, and he was very well known in Turkey.
 Aytekin Akkaya as Captain America. He doesn't have his shield and his mask lacks the wings on the side of his head.
 Tevfik Şen as Spider-Man. He is depicted as a villain, with none of his abilities from the comics. His only superpower here is the ability to come back unharmed from death multiple times, sometimes interpreted as making clones of himself. 
 Doğan Tamer as Inspector Orhan
 Deniz Erkanat as Julia. Captain America's girlfriend and superhero partner.
 Mine Sun as Nadya. Spider-Man's girlfriend and partner in crime.
 Altan Günbay as Nightclub Owner
 Ersun Kazançel as Bartender
 Osman Han as Bouncer
 Ali Ekdal as Commissioner
 Nilgün Ceylan	as Janet
 İhsan Baysal as Bouncer
 Mehmet Yağmur as Spider-Man's henchman

See also 
 Dünyayı Kurtaran Adam – a Turkish film known to use ripoff footage, most notably from Star Wars

References

External links

Review of film with screenshots and clips
Review of movie at I-Mockery (contains significant plot detail)

1973 films
1970s Turkish-language films
Turkish superhero films
1970s rediscovered films
1970s superhero films
1970s vigilante films
Unofficial Spider-Man films
Captain America films
Films set in Turkey
Turkish action films
Films about cloning
Turkish vigilante films
Cultural depictions of El Santo
Turkish films about revenge
Unofficial film adaptations
1970s American films